Salt is a municipality in the comarca of the Gironès in Catalonia, Spain. It is situated on the right bank of the Ter next to Girona, with which it was merged from 1974 to 1984. The A-7 autopista and N-141 road pass through the municipality.

From 1895, Salt was the temporary Girona terminus of the narrow gauge Olot–Girona railway, until the short section to Girona railway station was opened in 1898. Initially the line ran only as far as Amer, but it was extended to Les Planes d'Hostoles in 1900, Sant Feliu de Pallerols in 1902 and Olot in 1911. The line closed in 1969 and has since been converted into a greenway.

Demography 

Salt is known for its elevated ethnic diversity. Over 77 nationalities are represented in the population of Salt: In 2011, 17,739 (56%) were Spanish, 5,032 (15%) were Moroccan; 1,863 (6%) Gambians; 1,272 (4%) Honduran; 728 (2%) Malian, and 554 (1.7%) Senegalese.

Manufacturing 
Salt is the home of Gas Gas, who manufacture and export off-road motorcycles and all-terrain vehicles worldwide from their Salt base.

Notable people
Lluís Dilmé i Romagós (1960-), architect and urban planner
Delfí Geli (1969-), footballer
Anna Allen (1977-), actress

References

Bibliography
 Panareda Clopés, Josep Maria; Rios Calvet, Jaume; Rabella Vives, Josep Maria (1989). Guia de Catalunya, Barcelona: Caixa de Catalunya.  (Spanish).  (Catalan).

External links
Ajuntament de Salt
 Government data pages 

Municipalities in Gironès
Populated places in Gironès